Killer Instinct is an American crime drama television series filmed in Vancouver that originally aired on the Fox Network. The pilot episode aired on September 23, 2005, and the final episode aired on December 2, 2005.

Fox ordered 13 episodes, only nine of which were broadcast in the United States; the remaining four premiered in the UK on Five, then on Universal HD. The series has also been broadcast in France, New Zealand, Croatia, Italy, Netherlands, Australia, Japan, and Poland.

Premise
Johnny Messner plays Detective Jack Hale of the San Francisco Police Department.  Hale has a history of causing tension in whatever department to which he is assigned, as much for his abrasive nature towards co-workers as the direct and sometimes unsettling manner in which he conducts investigations.  Hale's reputation is also worsened by the infamy of his father, a self-confessed serial killer currently serving life in prison.  The gruesome nature of his father's crimes combined with Hale's attitude has led many of his co-workers to wonder if he will one day become a serial killer himself, a fear which Hale secretly shares.  Nonetheless,  this strong familiarity with serial killers leads to Hale being recruited by the Deviant Crimes Unit.

The Deviant Crimes Unit's mission is to track down the perpetrators of unusual crimes within the city. Each new crime spree is investigated by the head of the unit, Lieutenant Matt Cavanaugh (Chi McBride), who judges whether the crime is "deviant" enough to be investigated by the DCU.  In addition to Hale and Cavanaugh, the DCU employs Detective Danielle Carter (Kristin Lehman), whose analytical nature clashes both with the impulsive Hale and the subjective nature of their shared mission.

Cast

Main cast
 Johnny Messner as Det. Jack Hale
 Marguerite Moreau as Det. Ava Lyford ("Pilot" only)
 Kristin Lehman as Det. Danielle Carter (episode two onward)
 Chi McBride as Lt. Matt Cavanaugh

Recurring cast
 Ramon De Ocampo as Harry Oka
 Jessica Steen as Dr. Francine Klepp
 Benita Ha as Riley
 Byron Lawson as Det. Lee
 Adam Reid as Boze

Episodes

References

External links
 

2000s American crime drama television series
2000s American police procedural television series
2005 American television series debuts
2005 American television series endings
English-language television shows
Fox Broadcasting Company original programming
Television series by 20th Century Fox Television
Television shows set in San Francisco
Fictional portrayals of the San Francisco Police Department
Television shows filmed in Vancouver